John Roger Kirkpatrick Scott (July 6, 1873 – December 9, 1945) was a Republican member of the U.S. House of Representatives from Pennsylvania.

John Roger Kirkpatrick Scott, father of Hardie Scott, was born in Bloomsburg, PA, and moved with his parents to Wilkes-Barre, PA, and later to Philadelphia.

He graduated from the Central High School of Philadelphia in 1893, and attended the law school of the University of Pennsylvania at Philadelphia.  He was admitted to the bar in December, 1895, and commenced the practice of law in Philadelphia.  He was a member of the Pennsylvania State House of Representatives in 1899 and again in 1909, 1911, and 1913.

Scott was elected as a Republican to the Sixty-fourth and Sixty-fifth Congresses and served from March 4, 1915, until his resignation, effective on January 5, 1919.

Sources

External links

 

1873 births
1945 deaths
Republican Party members of the United States House of Representatives from Pennsylvania
Republican Party members of the Pennsylvania House of Representatives
University of Pennsylvania Law School alumni